John Ainslie Newell (born October 6, 1935) is a Canadian former politician. He represented the electoral district of Cape Breton The Lakes in the Nova Scotia House of Assembly from 1983 to 1988. He was a Progressive Conservative.

Born in 1935 at Sydney, Nova Scotia, Newell served on Cape Breton County Council from 1976 to 1982. He first attempted to enter provincial politics in the 1981 election, but was defeated by Liberal Ossie Fraser by 120 votes. Fraser died in October 1982, and Newell was elected the new MLA for the riding in a byelection on February 22, 1983. He was re-elected in the 1984 election, but was defeated by Liberal Bernie Boudreau in the 1988 election.

References

1935 births
Living people
Progressive Conservative Association of Nova Scotia MLAs
People from Sydney, Nova Scotia
Nova Scotia municipal councillors